This bibliography of William McKinley is a comprehensive list of written and published works about or by William McKinley, the 25th president of the United States.

Domestic issues and politics
 Armstrong, William H. Major McKinley: William McKinley and the Civil War (2000)
 Faulkner, Harold U. Politics, Reform, and Expansion, 1890–1900 (1959)
 Glad, Paul W. McKinley, Bryan, and the People (1964)
 Jensen, Richard. The Winning of the Midwest: Social and Political Conflict, 1888–1896 (1971)
 Jones, Stanley L. The Presidential Election of 1896 (1964)
 Josephson, Matthew. The Politicos: 1865–1896 (1938)
 Morgan, H. Wayne. From Hayes to McKinley: National Party Politics, 1877–1896 (1969)
 Rhodes, James Ford. The McKinley and Roosevelt Administrations, 1897–1909 (1922)
 Saldin, Robert P. "William McKinley and the Rhetorical Presidency," Presidential Studies Quarterly (March 2011) 41#1 pp. 119–34, 
 Skrabec, Quentin R. William McKinley, apostle of protectionism (Algora, 2008).
 Williams, R. Hal. Years of Decision: American Politics in the 1890s (1993).

Foreign policy
 
 
 Dobson, John M. Reticient Expansionism: The Foreign Policy of William McKinley. (1988).
 Fry Joseph A. "William McKinley and the Coming of the Spanish–American War: A Study of the Besmirching and Redemption of an Historical Image," Diplomatic History 3 (Winter 1979): 77–97
 Gould, Lewis L. The Spanish–American War and President McKinley (1982)
 Hamilton, Richard. President McKinley, War, and Empire (2006).
 Harrington, Fred H. "The Anti-Imperialist Movement in the United States, 1898–1900," Mississippi Valley Historical Review, Vol. 22, No. 2 (Sept. 1935), pp. 211–30 
 Holbo, Paul S. "Presidential Leadership in Foreign Affairs: William McKinley and the Turpie-Foraker Amendment," The American Historical Review 1967 72 (4): 1321–35. 
  
 May, Ernest. Imperial Democracy: The Emergence of America as a Great Power (1961)
 Offner, John L. "McKinley and the Spanish–American War," Presidential Studies Quarterly Vol. 34#1 (2004) pp 50+.
 Offner, John L. An Unwanted War: The Diplomacy of the United States and Spain over Cuba, 1895–1898 (1992)
 Paterson. Thomas G. "United States Intervention in Cuba, 1898: Interpretations of the Spanish-American-Cuban-Filipino War," The History Teacher, Vol. 29, No. 3 (May 1996), pp. 341–61 
 Trask, David. The War with Spain in 1898. (1981).

Speeches and manuscripts
 McKinley, William. Speeches and Addresses of William McKinley: from his election to Congress to the present time (1893)
 McKinley, William. Abraham Lincoln. An Address by William McKinley of Ohio. Before the Marquette Club. Chicago. February 12, 1896 (1896)
 McKinley, William. Speeches and Addresses of William McKinley: from March 1, 1897, to May 30, 1900 (1900)
 McKinley, William. The Tariff; a Review of the Tariff Legislation of the United States from 1812 to 1896 (1904)

References

McKinley
McKinley, William
William McKinley-related lists